Sir John Armytage, 2nd Baronet (13 July 1732 – 10 September 1758) was a British politician.

He was the oldest son of Sir Samuel Armytage, 1st Baronet and his wife Anne Griffith, daughter of Thomas Griffith, and was educated at Eton. In 1747, he succeeded his father as baronet. He was admitted to Trinity College, Cambridge in 1751, receiving his MA in 1753. Armytage was a Member of Parliament (MP) for York between 1754 and 1758.

He died in the Battle of Saint Cast, France, having been a volunteer in the Seven Years' War, unmarried and aged only 27, and was succeeded in the baronetcy by his younger brother George.

References

1732 births
1758 deaths
Baronets in the Baronetage of Great Britain
British MPs 1754–1761
Members of the Parliament of Great Britain for English constituencies
British military personnel killed in the Seven Years' War
British Army officers
People educated at Eton College
British Army personnel of the Seven Years' War